I Want Your Love is Brenda K. Starr's debut album. This was a small label release on Mirage Records in 1985, distributed by Atlantic Records.  It features her Freestyle music hit, "Pickin' Up Pieces," which peaked at #9 on the Hot Dance Music/Club Play chart in 1986, as well as the popular ballad, "Love Me Like the First Time," which Stacy Lattisaw recorded a year later on her album Take Me All The Way.

Track listing
"Suspicion" (Lotti Golden, Richard Scher) 5:18
"Pickin' Up Pieces" (Golden, Arthur Baker) 4:40
"Look Who's Cryin' Now" (Starr, Scher, Golden) 4:57
"I Want Your Love" (Nile Rodgers) 4:55
"Boys Like You" (Golden, Scher) 6:00
"I Can Love You Better" (Sturken, Rogers) 5:02
"Love Me Like the First Time" (Frank Wildhorn, Gary Benson) 3:19
"You're the One For Me" (Sturken, Rogers) 4:40
"Pickin' Up Pieces" (long version) 6:38
"Pickin' Up Pieces" (instrumental) 6:28
"Suspicion" (remix) 6:06
"Suspicion" (dub version) 5:12

Personnel
Brenda K. Starr: Vocals, Rap
MCA: Rap
Bo Brown, BJ Nelson, Craig Derry, Will Downing, Lotti Golden, Audrey Wheeler, Cindy Mizelle, Evan Rogers: Vocal Backing
Richard Scher: Keyboards, Synth Bass, Drum Programming, Simmons Drum Overdubs, Backing Vocals
Andy Schwartz: Acoustic Piano
G.E. Smith, Ira Siegel, Charlie Street, Skip McDonald: Guitars
Carl Sturken: Guitars, Keyboards
Doug Wimbish, John Nevin: Bass
Arthur Baker: Bass, Drums
Cosa: Congas

1985 debut albums
Brenda K. Starr albums
Albums produced by Arthur Baker (musician)